Second Reformed Dutch Church (also known as Mt. Carmel Roman Catholic Church; Ironbound Educational and Igreja Assembleia de deus) is a historic church building at 178-184 Edison Place in Newark, Essex County, New Jersey, United States.

It was built in 1848 originally for a Dutch Reformed congregation. The building added to the National Register of Historic Places in 1979. It has been home to several other congregations since its founding, including Igreja Assembleia de deus, an Assemblies of God congregation led by Pastor Welbr DosSantos.

See also 
 National Register of Historic Places listings in Essex County, New Jersey

References

Churches in Newark, New Jersey
Churches on the National Register of Historic Places in New Jersey
Churches completed in 1848
19th-century Reformed Church in America church buildings
National Register of Historic Places in Newark, New Jersey
New Jersey Register of Historic Places